Menorahs and Minarets: A Novel is a 2017 book by Egyptian author Kamal Ruhayyim.

It constitutes the third part of the "Galal trilogy", dealing with the life of Galal, an Egyptian man with a Muslim father and a Jewish mother. After residing a decade in Paris, he returns to Cairo in the 1970s, where he faces the fact that he no longer belongs to his old Egyptian home.

This book was translated into English by Sarah Enany and published by AUC Press.

References

2017 novels
Egyptian novels
Novels set in Cairo
Novels set in the 1970s
Jewish Egyptian history
Islam and Judaism